The White Moll is a lost 1920 American silent feature length crime drama film directed by Harry Millarde and starring Pearl White. It was produced and distributed by the Fox Film Corporation.
It was based on a novel by the same name, by Frank L. Packard.
It marked Pearl White's return to feature films and her first film for Fox Film Corporation.

Cast
Pearl White as Rhoda, The White Moll
Richard Travers as The Adventurer, The Pug (credited as Richard C. Travers)
Jack Baston as The Dangler (credited as J. Thornton Baston)
Walter P. Lewis as The Sparrow (credited as Walter Lewis)
Eva Gordon as Gypsy Nan
John Woodford as Father Michael
George Pauncefort as Rhoda's Father
Charles Slattery as Detective Henry
John P. Wade as The Rich Man
William Harvey as Skinny
Blanche Davenport (unconfirmed role)

See also
1937 Fox vault fire

References

External links

 
allmovie/synopsis; The White Moll
Packard, Frank L. (1920), The White Moll, Toronto: The Copp, Clark Company, on the Internet Archive

1920 films
American silent feature films
Lost American films
Films based on Canadian novels
American crime drama films
Fox Film films
American black-and-white films
Films directed by Harry F. Millarde
1920 crime drama films
1920 lost films
1920s American films
Silent American drama films